The Shivers may refer to:

The Shivers (Austin, Texas), alt-country band formed 1988
The Shivers (New York City), rock, folk and soul band formed 2001